The discography of Sam Cooke, an American singer and songwriter, consists of fourteen studio albums (including one collaborative album and two notable posthumous releases), two live albums, 49 singles, 13 compilations and 2 box sets. Over the course of his eight-year career, Cooke placed 29 singles in the Top 40 on the Billboard Pop Singles chart. He also placed 20 singles in the Top Ten of Billboard R&B chart, Black Singles chart. Between 1957 and 1960, Sam Cooke's records were produced on the Keen label. From 1960 through 1966, they were produced on the RCA label.

Ownership of Cooke's material is split between RCA (roughly 1958–1963) and ABKCO (post-1963), with each label releasing their own compilations and rarely cross-licensing (The Man and His Music and Portrait of a Legend: 1951–1964 being the two exceptions). As a result, few of Cooke's original albums saw individual release on the medium of compact disc, and, consequently, digital distribution, although all of Cooke's recorded work has been released either in compilation or box set.

Albums

Studio albums

Posthumous studio albums

Live albums

Collaboration albums

Compilation albums
Numerous compilation albums and greatest hits collections of Cooke's work have been released, notably Portrait of a Legend: 1951–1964 in 2003. This list compiles the most notable compilation releases from major labels. Many cross-licensed compilations from smaller labels (most of which contain Cooke's gospel work with the Soul Stirrers) are not represented here.

Box sets

Singles

Posthumous singles

Billboard Year-End performances

Notes

References

External links
 
 

Discography
Discographies of American artists
Soul music discographies